Varkala Sathyan (born Narayanan Sathyaseelan) is an Indian film, TV and stage actor. He has acted in over 12 Malayalam films, 5 Malayalam TV serials and 2 Arabic TV serials.

Varkala Sathyan started his career in 1965 at All India Radio, Kozhikode and moved to Radio Abudhabi, UAE in 1970.

Acted films

Acted television serials

External links 

 Meet the Star - Official website of Amma
 An interview by NTV Dubai-in 2010 Part -1 
 An interview by NTV Dubai-in 2010 Part - 2

Indian male film actors
People from Varkala
Indian male stage actors
Indian male television actors
Male actors in Malayalam television
Living people
Year of birth missing (living people)
20th-century Indian male actors
21st-century Indian male actors
Male actors from Kerala